Manam Oru Kurangu is a 1967 Indian Tamil-language satirical film directed by A. T. Krishnaswamy and produced by T. V. Arasu. Based on the play of the same name, itself inspired by the 1913 George Bernard Shaw play Pygmalion, the film stars Cho Ramaswamy (who also wrote the screenplay), R. Muthuraman, T. S. Balaiah, A. V. M. Rajan, K. R. Vijaya and Vijayarani. It was released on 14 January 1967 and became a commercial success.

Plot 

Maruthayi is a village-based vegetable seller who, by sheer accident, becomes an actress named Mallika Devi. Murgesa, a farmer from the same village, loves Maruthayi and wants to marry her, but after she becomes an actress, she moves away from him. It was Gopinath, a wealthy socialite, who made her an actress as he laid a challenge that he would transform a vegetable seller into an actor if his regular heroine exited at the last second. A rich man's son Chellappa aspires to marry Maruthayi, but ends up marrying another girl. Murgesa realises that Maruthayi has a new status; when he tries to meet her, Gopinath discourages him, and he returns to his village. When Gopinath confesses his love for Maruthayi, she does not reciprocate. She is left alone, with nowhere to go.

Cast 
 Cho Ramaswamy as Chellappa
 R. Muthuraman as Murugesa
 T. S. Balaiah as Chellappa's father
 A. V. M. Rajan as Gopinath
 K. R. Vijaya as Maruthayi / Mallika Devi
 Vijayarani as Chellappa's wife

Production 
Manam Oru Kurangu was a play written by Cho Ramaswamy and inspired by the George Bernard Shaw play Pygmalion. It was originally announced as Dil Ek Bandhar, a pun on the title Dil Ek Mandir. The play Manam Oru Kurangu, which also starred Delhi Ganesh, was later adapted into a feature film with the same name directed by A. T. Krishnaswamy and produced by T. V. Arasu under Sashti Films. Cho was part of the cast and also wrote the screenplay. M. P. Viswanathan worked as an assistant make-up artist.

Themes 
The film exposes the snobbish values dominating society in everyday life.

Soundtrack 
The soundtrack was composed by D. B. Ramachandran. The title song, performed by T. M. Soundararajan, became the film's most popular song.

Release and reception 
Manam Oru Kurangu was released on 14 January 1967, during the festive occasion of Pongal. Kalki called it a film worth watching for relieving stress. Despite facing competition from other Pongal releases such as Kandhan Karunai, Pattathu Rani and Penne Nee Vaazhga, the film emerged a commercial success.

References

Bibliography

External links 
 

1960s satirical films
1960s Tamil-language films
1967 films
Films about actors
Films based on adaptations
Indian films based on plays
Indian satirical films